Henny Harald Hansen (née Plenge; 8 April 1900 in Copenhagen – 12 October 1993) was a Danish anthropologist and ethnographer, best remembered for her publications Daughters of Allah: Among Muslim Women in Kurdistan (1958) and Kurdish Women's Lives: Field Research in a Muslim Society (1961), studying Kurds, and in particular Kurdish women.

References 

1900 births
1993 deaths
Danish anthropologists
Danish ethnographers
Kurdish studies